Myopia Hunt Club is a foxhunting and private country club in South Hamilton, Massachusetts, northeast of Boston. In the early years of the U.S. Open, the club hosted it four times: 1898, 1901, 1905, and 1908.

History
Myopia Hunt Club was founded in 1882 by J. Murray Forbes. The golf course was designed and built by Herbert C. Leeds in 1894 and he continued working at the Club for over 30 years. Leeds tied for seventh place in the 1898 U.S. Open held at Myopia Hunt Club. His familiarity with the course was no doubt a factor in his ability to finish so high on the leaderboard in the tournament.

The name "Myopia" is due to some of its founding members having come from the Myopia Club in Winchester, Massachusetts, which had been founded by four brothers with poor vision, or myopia. Today, the Myopia Hunt Club is a drag hunt, meaning that the hounds follow a laid scent rather than live fox.

When completed, Myopia Hunt Club measured 6,539 yards and Leeds made certain that golfers would encounter a multitude of challenging features, including tall mounds, deep bunkers, lightning-fast greens, blind shots requiring substantial carry, deep swales, punishing rough, plateaued greens, as well as a pond and paddock to avoid.  So difficult was the course that in the 1901 U.S. Open not a single professional was able to break 80 in any round.

Polo
Myopia also features one of the  oldest continually running polo fields in the nation. Gibney Field, formerly used  as a pasture, was mowed and used for practice in the summer of 1888. That fall, Myopia held its first official match against the Dedham Polo and Country Club. In 1890, Myopia became one of seven charter members of the Polo Association, now the United States Polo Association. Of those seven original clubs, Myopia is one of two still in existence; Meadowbrook on Long Island is the other. It is the only one that still uses its original field.

Gibney Field is not, however, the oldest continuously used polo field in the nation. That honor goes to Aiken Polo Club's Whitney Field—in Aiken, South Carolina—which was first used for polo in a gala exhibition match in 1882. Aiken Polo Club joined the Polo Association in 1899. Polo is still played at Myopia throughout the summer season, from Memorial Day until Columbus Day. Sunday afternoon games at 3 p.m. are open to the public for a small fee. In 1902 a real tennis court was opened at the Myopia Hunt Club, but has since been converted to other uses.

Golf
Myopia Hunt Club is the only course in the United States to have been listed by Golf Magazine as having two of the United States's top 100 signature holes, Myopia's fourth and ninth.

The U.S. Open was held at the Club in 1898, 1901, 1905, and 1908. The 72-hole winning score in 1901 by Willie Anderson, one of only four four-time champions, was 331, a record high that still stands today. He defeated Alex Smith in an 18-hole playoff, 85 to 86, his highest 18-hole score of the tournament. The first nine was completed in 1896, but the second nine was not finished until October, 1898,  so the June, 1898 U.S. Open was actually played over eight rounds of nine holes.

Myopia Hunt Club scorecard

From 1995–2005, the course underwent a series of major improvements under the leadership of Club president Michael Greene. Greene, along with Captain of Golf Steve Warhover (and with the consent of the voting members of the Club), lengthened the course with several new tees. These were installed on the 2nd, 4th, 7th, 10th, 11th, 15th, and 18th holes. In addition, many trees throughout the course were removed and replaced with traditional mounds, better fitting the historic design of Herbert Corey Leeds.

Myopia Hunt Club was the home course of the late novelist and golf writer John Updike.

The holes on the course are all named on the scorecard, with most of the names pertaining to a geographic signifier on a particular hole:

 First
 Lookout
 Brae
 Miles River
 Lone Tree
 Brook
 Myopia
 Prairie
 Pond
 Alps
 Road
 Valley
 Hill
 Ridge
 Long
 Paddock
 West
 Home

See also
Myopia Club (of Winchester, Massachusetts)

References

External links

Golf Tripper – Myopia Hunt Club

1882 establishments in Massachusetts
Defunct real tennis venues
Golf clubs and courses in Massachusetts
Clubs and societies in the United States
Buildings and structures in Essex County, Massachusetts
Hamilton, Massachusetts
Sports in Essex County, Massachusetts
Sports venues completed in 1882